The 2019–20 season is Agropecuario's third consecutive season in the second division of Argentine football, Primera B Nacional.

The season generally covers the period from 1 July 2019 to 30 June 2020.

Review

Pre-season
Emanuel Molina became their first signing of 2019–20, as the central midfielder penned terms on 2 May 2019 from Villa Dálmine. Later that month, goalkeeper Germán Salort switched Agropecuario for Instituto. Fellow 'keeper Martín Perafán (Mitre) took his place on 6 June, which preceded a double incoming on 8 June as Matías Defederico and Nicolás Dematei joined from Apollon Smyrnis and Independiente Rivadavia respectively. Cristian Barinaga said his goodbyes on 10 June as he signed for San Martín (SJ), while forwards Mauro Albertengo (Atlético de Rafaela) and Martín Comachi (Villa Dálmine) put pen to paper on deals with the club across the next three days. Gonzalo Goñi and Nicolás Talpone, players who were on loan during the previous season, officially left on 30 June.

Agropecuario completed a third transaction from Villa Dálmine on 5 July, as attacking midfielder Mariano Miño made the move to Carlos Casares. They opened their pre-season campaign with a 6–0 victory over Deportivo Argentino, with Alejandro Gagliardi notching a brace. Their second friendly was played on 12 July versus Quilmes, with a goalless draw being followed a two-goal win thanks to Franco Colela. Fernando Juárez was loaned from Talleres of the Primera División on 23 July. Sarmiento visited Agropecuario on 24 July, drawing and losing across two encounters at the Estadio Ofelia Rosenzuaig in Buenos Aires. 24/25 July saw two departures sealed as Reinaldo Alderete and Gonzalo Klusener headed off to Atlético de Rafaela and Independiente Rivadavia respectively.

They and Sarmiento scheduled rematches on 27 July, which again ended in a tie and a win - though this time in favour of Agropecuario. They travelled to Deportivo Morón on 2 August for their fifth day of friendlies, beating their league rivals 0–2 prior to losing 2–1. Agropecuario defeated Compañía General in a friendly on 8 August.

August
Goals from Exequiel Narese and Mariano Miño gave Agropecuario victory on matchday one in Primera B Nacional, as they beat newly-promoted Alvarado away from home on 18 August. Agropecuario followed that with a further three points against Belgrano on 25 August, as Mariano Miño netted again.

September
Agropecuario lost their third league fixture to Estudiantes (BA) on 2 September.

Squad

Transfers
Domestic transfer windows:3 July 2019 to 24 September 201920 January 2020 to 19 February 2020.

Transfers in

Transfers out

Loans in

Friendlies

Pre-season
A friendly with Deportivo Argentino was scheduled for 9 July 2019, while Quilmes and Sarmiento would also travel to Agropecuario on 12/24 July. Rematches with Sarmiento and games with Deportivo Morón and Compañía General were also scheduled.

Competitions

Primera B Nacional

League table

Results summary

Matches
The fixtures for the 2019–20 league season were announced on 1 August 2019, with a new format of split zones being introduced. Agropecuario were drawn in Zone A.

Squad statistics

Appearances and goals

Statistics accurate as of 3 September 2019.

Goalscorers

Notes

References

Club Agropecuario Argentino seasons
Agropecuario